Aerogem Aviation Ltd (sometimes written AeroGEM Aviation) was a Ghanaian cargo airline based in Ghana. Its head office is in the 1 Gemini Airlines Building in Old Cargo Village, Kotoka International Airport, Accra. It operates worldwide non-scheduled cargo flights. Its main bases are Kotoka International Airport, Accra and Sharjah International Airport, United Arab Emirates.

History

The airline was established and started operations in 2000 as Aerogem Cargo using a wet leased Boeing 707-320C aircraft. It was renamed Aerogem Aviation in October 2004. It has 16 employees (at March 2007).

Fleet

The Aerogem Cargo fleet consists of the following aircraft (at September 2020):
1 Boeing 707-320C

Former fleet 
2 Douglas DC-8-63F

Notes

References

External links
Aerogem Aviation

Defunct airlines of Ghana
Cargo airlines
Airlines established in 2000
Ghanaian companies established in 2000